Richard Basset or Bassett may refer to:
 Richard Basset (died between 1135 and 1144), royal judge and sheriff during the reign of King Henry I of England
 Richard Basset, 1st Baron Basset of Weldon, English noble
 Richard Bassett (priest) (1777–1852), Welsh cleric
 Richard Bassett (Delaware politician) (1745–1815), American lawyer and politician
 Richard Bassett (Indiana politician) (1846–1905), Indiana Baptist minister and state legislator
 Richard H. Bassett (1900–1995), American impressionist painter
 Richard Bassett (author) (born 1955), British writer, historian and musician
 Richard Basset (JAG), investigated claims Guantanamo guards bragged about abusing captives; see Heather Cerveny

See also
SS Richard Bassett, American ship, launched 1942, named after the Delaware politician